Vüqar Asgarov  (born 14 May 1985 in Sumgayit) is an Azerbaijani football second striker who currently plays for SK Super Nova. He also holds Latvian citizenship.

Career
Vüqar Asgarov was born in Azerbaijan, but moved to Latvia in an early age. Vüqar Asgarov began his career in Liepājas Metalurgs system and there he played until 2008. Later he played for Latvian First League clubs FK Jelgava and FC Jūrmala. In 2010, Äsgärov joined another Latvian First League side SFK Varavīksne and after scoring a goal against Metalurgs in Latvian Cup, he was invited to join them. After three years with Liepājas Metalurgs, he left Latvia and signed for Azerbaijani club Sumgayit a two-year contract. In December 2013, Äsgärov left Sumgayit, and whilst looking for a new club trained with his old club Liepājas Metalurgs

In June 2014, Asgarov signed for newly promoted Azerbaijan Premier League side Araz-Naxçıvan.

International career
Asgarov made his debut for Azerbaijan national team on 24 February 2012 against Singapore.

References

External links

1985 births
Living people
Association football forwards
Azerbaijani footballers
Azerbaijani expatriate footballers
Azerbaijan international footballers
People from Sumgait
FK Jelgava players
FC Jūrmala players
FK Liepājas Metalurgs players
Zira FK players
BFC Daugavpils players
FK Liepāja players
Sumgayit FK players
AFA Olaine players
Araz-Naxçıvan PFK players
Latvian Higher League players
Azerbaijan Premier League players
Expatriate footballers in Latvia
Azerbaijani expatriate sportspeople in Latvia